The 2019 TCR Asia Series season was the fifth season of the TCR Asia Series.

Luca Engstler was the defending drivers' champion, while Liqui Moly Team Engstler were the defending teams' champions.

Race Calendar 
The provisional 2019 schedule was announced on 18 December 2018, with five events scheduled. The second round was originally scheduled to be held at the Korea International Circuit in support of the TCR Korea Touring Car Series, but following the series' cancellation it was replaced with the Zhuhai International Circuit in support of the TCR China Touring Car Championship

Teams and drivers

Results and standings

Drivers' championship

Teams' championship

TCR Asia Cup

Notes

References

External links 

 

TCR Asia Series
Asia Series